Amtrak California  is a brand name used by the California Department of Transportation (Caltrans) Division of Rail for three state-supported Amtrak commuter rail routes in Californiathe Capitol Corridor, the Pacific Surfliner, and the San Joaquinsand their associated connecting network of Thruway Motorcoach buses.

History

The National Railroad Passenger Corporation (Amtrak) assumed operation of almost all intercity passenger rail in the United States in 1971. Service in California, as in most of the United States, was basic and infrequent. In 1976 California began providing financial assistance to Amtrak. At the same time, the Caltrans Division of Rail was formed to oversee state-financed rail operations and the brand Amtrak California started appearing on state-supported routes.

In 1990, California passed Propositions 108 and 116, providing $3 billion for transportation projects ($ billion after inflation), with a large portion going to rail service. As a result, new locomotives and passenger cars were purchased by the state, and existing inter-city routes expanded. A more distinct image for Amtrak California, such as painting locomotives and passenger cars in "California Color" of blue and yellow, was established with the arrival of new rolling stock.

In 1998, while still funded by the state, the management of the Capitol Corridor was transferred to the Capitol Corridor Joint Powers Authority (CCJPA), formed by local jurisdictions of the line serves. In 2015 the management of the San Joaquin and the Pacific Surfliner were similarly transferred to the San Joaquin Joint Powers Authority (SJJPA) and the Los Angeles-San Diego-San Luis Obispo Rail Corridor Agency (LOSSAN), respectively. As a result, the Amtrak California brand became less prominent in the websites and marketing materials.

 Caltrans is studying Amtrak service to the Coachella Valley.

Routes

Pacific Surfliner

The Pacific Surfliner serves Southern California on a route between San Luis Obispo and San Diego via Los Angeles; most trains only travel a portion of the route. It hugs the California coast for most of the routecoming as close as providing views of the Pacific Ocean. With 2.7 million passengers in fiscal year 2013, it is Amtrak California's most heavily used service and the most used Amtrak service outside the Northeast Corridor, behind only the Northeast Regional and the Acela Express. It is also the oldest, dating to 1939 with the Santa Fe's San Diegan.

San Joaquin

The San Joaquin operates 14 trains (7 in each direction) each day between Bakersfield and Stockton. From Stockton, five trains from Bakersfield continue west to Oakland, while two trains proceed north to the state capital of Sacramento. Central Valley communities served include Fresno, Corcoran, Hanford, Lodi, Madera, Merced, Modesto, Turlock/Denair and Wasco. Delta/Bay communities of Antioch, Martinez, and Richmond are also served by the San Joaquin. Los Angeles is not served on this route due to the bottleneck of the Tehachapi Pass line, where the Union Pacific prohibits passenger train use due to freight traffic along the world's busiest single-track railway. (On rare occasions Amtrak trains use this as a detour if their railway tracks are being repaired.) The San Joaquin has operated since 1974.

Capitol Corridor

The Capitol Corridor route, operating since 1991, runs north from San Jose through the East Bay to Oakland and Richmond, then east through the Delta communities of Martinez and Suisun City, and the Sacramento Valley cities of Davis and Sacramento. One Capitol Corridor train per day continues east of Sacramento during the afternoon commute to the small Sierra Nevada town of Auburn, returning in the morning. It is the fourth-busiest Amtrak route nationwide.

Rolling stock

Locomotives

Amtrak California operates a fleet of EMD F59PHI, GE Dash 8-32BWH and Siemens Charger locomotives that are used on San Joaquin and Capitol Corridor trains. These locomotives are owned by Caltrans and carry the CDTX reporting marks.

Locomotives from Amtrak's national fleet such as P42DC are often used as substitutes when the Amtrak California dedicated fleet of locomotives undergoes maintenance.

Twenty-two additional locomotives built by Siemens will join Amtrak California's locomotive fleet starting from 2017. These locomotives, named Charger, were parts of a multi-state order funded by a combination of federal and state money. Illinois Department of Transportation, acting as the leading agency, awarded the order to Siemens on December 18, 2013. Caltrans ordered the first six with the initial order in 2013, then exercised the option to buy 14 more locomotives in 2015 to replace Amtrak-owned locomotives currently used on Pacific Surfliner. Two additional locomotives were ordered in 2016.

Passenger cars

California Car / Surfliner bi-level trainsets 

Amtrak California's routes typically use bi-level, high-capacity passenger cars, dubbed the Surfliner and California Car. All of the California Cars are owned by the California Department of Transportation (Caltrans). Amtrak owns most of the Surfliner cars with some owned by Caltrans.

The design of the cars is based on Amtrak's Superliner bi-level passenger cars, but several changes were made to the design to make the vehicle more suitable for corridor services with frequent stops. One significant difference is that the Surfliner and California Car have two sets of automatic doors on each side instead of only one manually operated door on the Superliners, which speeds up boarding and alighting considerably. Additionally, Surfliner and California Car coaches are equipped with higher-density seating and bicycle racks to permit transport of unboxed bicycles.

Consists on the San Joaquin, Capitol Corridor, and Pacific Surfliner routes usually include between four and six cars, with one locomotive and a cab control car on the rear end.

Superliner I rebuilds 
In 2007, Amtrak California paid for the repair of seven wreck-damaged Superliner Coaches owned by Amtrak in exchange for a six-year lease, intended to quickly add capacity on busy Capitol Corridor and San Joaquin trains. Four of the cars have been painted to match the "California car" livery, and three have been painted to match the "Surfliner" livery. Each car also has the current Amtrak logo on the middle left side of each car.

Superliner I/II coaches from Amtrak's national fleet are used on some consists due to shortages of inter-city "Surfliner" & "California cars."

Comet car single-level trainsets 

Increasing ridership on the San Joaquin led Amtrak California to purchase 14 Comet IB rail cars from NJ Transit in 2008 for $75,000 per car. Caltrans paid approximately $20 million to have these former commuter cars refurbished and reconfigured to serve as intercity coaches at Amtrak's Beech Grove Shops.

Caltrans has also paid to lease and refurbish 3 Horizon dinettes (used as café cars) and 3 Non-Powered Control Units (old F40PH locomotives converted to serve as a cab/baggage car).

Siemens Venture single-level trainsets

In November 2017, the California Department of Transportation announced that it would be ordering seven Siemens Venture trainsets through its contractor Sumitomo Corporation. The states had initially contracted Sumitomo, which in turn subcontracted with Nippon Sharyo, to build the Next Generation Bi-Level Passenger Rail Car, but a prototype car failed a buff strength test in August 2015. After the test failure, Sumitomo canceled its deal with Nippon Sharyo, and turned to Siemens to be the new subcontractor. The cars are being built at the Siemens factory in Florin, California and will be hauled by California's existing fleet of diesel-electric locomotives.

California's trainsets will be used exclusively on the San Joaquins service and will consist of seven cars each: four coaches with economy seating, two coaches with economy seating and vending machines, and one cab car (control car) with economy seating. The order includes 49 cars for California, formed into seven semi-permanently-coupled trainsets. Since Siemens Venture trainsets were originally designed to be used with high platforms the SJJPA modify all stations, adding two mini-high platforms (short lengths of high platform, each long enough for one door, with an accessible ramp to the longer low platform). The first trainset is supposed to go into revenue service in 2020.

Livery
Amtrak California utilizes a livery and logo that is different from the standard Amtrak colors. All state-contracted Thruway Motorcoach and state-owned locomotives and passenger cars, with the exception of equipment used on the "Pacific Surfliner" route, are painted in the "California Colors" of blue and yellow. Each permanently assigned passenger car is named after a geographical feature of California.

The "Capitol Corridor" and "San Joaquin" trains are the two routes most identified with the Amtrak California image, since they extensively use "California Colored" equipment. The other state-supported rail route, the "Pacific Surfliner", uses a unique blue and silver paint scheme that is different from the other Amtrak California-branded trains.

The NPCUs that operate on the Capitol Corridor and San Joaquin are painted differently from the locomotives, as they are painted in the old "Caltrain" locomotive livery, with an Amtrak California and Caltrans logo on the sides. The single level cars, both the Comet cars and the Horizon dinettes, have three stripes closest to the boarding doors, orange, blue and green, which resemble the NJ Transit livery that was previously used on the Comet cars.

See also
List of Amtrak stations in California
List of San Francisco Bay Area trains
Other former state-supported rail services:
CalTrain – a short-lived service in Southern California, later re-established under local control
"Orange County Commuter" – commuter service conveyed to local control in 1994
Spirit of California – sleeper-service which ran between Los Angeles and Sacramento via Oakland from 1981 to 1983

References

External links
 Amtrak California
 Amtrak California Car Names
 Amtrak (national)
 The Rail Passenger Association of California (RailPAC) a statewide membership organization working for the expansion and improvement of rail passenger service within the states of California and Nevada.

California
Passenger rail transportation in California
California railroads
Public transportation in Southern California
1976 establishments in California
California Department of Transportation